Claudio Ariel Spontón Imhoff (born 14 September 1968) is an Argentine football manager and former player who played as a forward.

References

External links
 
 Profile at Futbol XXI

1968 births
Living people
Argentine footballers
Association football forwards
Argentine expatriate footballers
Club Atlético Lanús footballers
Olimpo footballers
Instituto footballers
Club Atlético River Plate footballers
San Martín de Tucumán footballers
Club Atlético Platense footballers
Gimnasia y Tiro footballers
Deportivo Toluca F.C. players
Club Alianza Lima footballers
Unión Española footballers
Chilean Primera División players
Argentine Primera División players
Liga MX players
Expatriate footballers in Chile
Expatriate footballers in Mexico
Expatriate footballers in Peru
Estudiantes de Río Cuarto footballers
Argentine football managers
Argentine Primera División managers
Club Atlético Platense managers